Diana Taylor may refer to:
 Diana Taylor (professor) (born 1950), professor at New York University's Tisch School of the Arts
 Diana Taylor (superintendent) (born 1955), New York State Superintendent of Banks
 Diana Taylor (General Hospital), a fictional character on the U.S. soap opera, General Hospital
 Diana Taylor (businesswoman), lawyer, business owner, and company director from Geelong, Victoria